S118 may refer to:
 SMS S 118 a German torpedo boat from World War I
 Letov Š-118, a Czechoslovakian aircraft
 USATC S118 Class, a 1942 class of 2-8-2 steam locomotive
 S118 road in Amsterdam